The Medigen Vaccine Biologics Corporation (MVC) is a pharmaceutical company headquartered in Neihu, Taipei, Taiwan.

History
The company was founded in October 2012. During the COVID-19 pandemic in Taiwan, the company produces the MVC COVID-19 vaccine to fight the virus.

Manufacturing plant
The company has a manufacturing plant in Hsinchu Biomedical Science Park, Zhubei City, Hsinchu County.

See also
 COVID-19 vaccination in Taiwan

References

External links

 

2012 establishments in Taiwan
Companies based in Taipei
Health care companies of Taiwan
Pharmaceutical companies established in 2012